Albert Frank Baisi (September 6, 1917 – April 16, 2005) was an American football player.  He played professionally in the National Football League (NFL) with the Chicago Bears in 1940, 1941, and 1946 and with the Philadelphia Eagles in 1947. Baisi played college football at West Virginia University.

References

External links
 
 

1917 births
2005 deaths
American football guards
Chicago Bears players
Philadelphia Eagles players
West Virginia Mountaineers football players
People from Randolph County, West Virginia
Players of American football from West Virginia